The men's 50m freestyle S7 event at the 2018 Commonwealth Games was held on 9 April at the Gold Coast Aquatic Centre. This was the first time the event had been held at a Commonwealth Games. Matthew Levy of Australia won gold, swimming a time of 28.60 seconds in the final.

Schedule
The schedule was as follows:

All times are Australian Eastern Standard Time (UTC+10)

Records
Prior to this competition, the existing world, Commonwealth and Games records were as follows:

Results

Heat
As only 6 swimmers entered, all competitors advanced to the final.

Final

References

Men's 0050 metre freestyle S7
Commonwealth Games